Maureen Coetzee is a medical entomologist, specialising in African malaria vector mosquitoes for over 40 years. She is currently a Distinguished Professor in the Wits Research Institute for Malaria, School of Pathology at the University of the Witwatersrand. She is a member of the Academy of Science of South Africa. She is a consultant in the  World Health Organization 's  Global Malaria Programme. She obtained her Doctorate from the University of the Witwatersrand. A subgenus of the Aedes mosquito, Coetzeemyia, was named after her. Also a genus of bacteria strongly associated with malaria mosquitoes, Coetzeea, was named after her. Professor Coetzee has published over 190 peer-reviewed scholarly articles.

Awards and honors
 The Kwame Nkrumah Science Award, (2011)

References

External links
 Maureen Coetzee on ResearchGate

Academic staff of the University of the Witwatersrand
South African women scientists
21st-century South African women scientists
Living people
1951 births